The 2020 Women's State of Origin was the third official Women's State of Origin rugby league match between the New South Wales and Queensland played at Sunshine Coast Stadium on 13 November 2020. The teams have played each other annually since 1999 with the 2020 game being the third played under the State of Origin banner.

Queensland defeated New South Wales 24–18, winning their first State of Origin game and winning their first game since 2014. Queensland  Tarryn Aiken was awarded the Nellie Doherty Medal for Player of the Match.

Background
The 2020 Women's State of Origin game was originally due to be played in June but, due to the COVID-19 pandemic, was moved to the post-season for the first time. The game was played in Queensland for the first time under the State of Origin banner and for the first time overall since 2016. Unlike in 2019, a women's under-18 Origin game was not held as the curtain-raiser.

Teams

Match summary

References 

2020 in Australian rugby league
2020 in women's rugby league
2020 in Australian women's sport
Rugby League State of Origin
Women's rugby league competitions in Australia
Rugby league in Queensland
Sport in the Sunshine Coast, Queensland